John Maybury (born 25 March 1958) is an English filmmaker and artist. He first came to prominence as the director of the music video for the Pet Shop Boys 1984 single "West End Girls". In 2005 he was named as one of the 100 most influential gay and lesbian people in Britain.

Life and career

Promo director
During the 1980s, Maybury produced a number of short films and music videos including for Sinéad O'Connor's "Nothing Compares 2 U", which was voted #35 in a Channel 4 poll of the greatest pop music videos and received various awards, and "West End Girls" by the Pet Shop Boys, a defining 1980s video.

Films
In 1998, Maybury produced his first full-length feature Love Is the Devil: Study for a Portrait of Francis Bacon, a biopic on the life of painter Francis Bacon starring Derek Jacobi and Daniel Craig. The film was screened in the Un Certain Regard section at the 1998 Cannes Film Festival.

In 2005, he directed  The Jacket with Adrien Brody and Keira Knightley. In 2008 his film  The Edge of Love, a biopic on the life of Welsh poet Dylan Thomas starring Sienna Miller, Cillian Murphy, Matthew Rhys  and Keira Knightley premiered. He also directed the final episode of the HBO/BBC Rome series.

Filmography as director
Love Is the Devil: Study for a Portrait of Francis Bacon (1998) - also writer
The Jacket (2005)
The Edge of Love (2008)

References

External links
 
 List of music videos directed by Maybury

1958 births
English music video directors
English television directors
LGBT film directors
British LGBT screenwriters
Living people
Film directors from London
LGBT television directors